HD 12139 is an orange-hued star in the northern zodiac constellation of Aries. With an apparent visual magnitude of 5.89, it is a dim star that is just visible to the naked eye under good viewing conditions. It is located approximately  distant from the Sun, based on parallax, but is drifting closer with a radial velocity of −2 km/s. With high probability, it is considered a member of the Hercules stream.

This object is an aging red giant with a stellar classification of K0III-IV, meaning that it has used up its core hydrogen and is expanding. At present it has 11 times the girth of the Sun. The star is about two billion years old with 1.7 times the mass of the Sun. It is radiating 58 times the luminosity of the Sun from its photosphere at an effective temperature of 4,780 K.

It is unclear if the two are physically associated.

References

K-type giants
Double stars
Aries (constellation)
Durchmusterung objects
012139
009307
0577